The 1912 New Mexico A&M Aggies football team was an American football team that represented New Mexico College of Agriculture and Mechanical Arts (now known as New Mexico State University) during the 1912 college football season.  In their third year under head coach Art Badenoch, the Aggies compiled a 5–1 record, shut out four opponents, and outscored all opponents by a total of 256 to 17. The team played its home games on Miller Field, sometimes also referred to as College Field.

Schedule

References

New Mexico AandM
New Mexico State Aggies football seasons
New Mexico AandM Aggies football